Castanopsis megacarpa is a tree in the family Fagaceae. The specific epithet  is from the Greek meaning "large fruit".

Description
The grey bark is smooth or slightly fissured.

Distribution and habitat
Castanopsis megacarpa grows naturally in Thailand, Borneo, Peninsular Malaysia and Singapore. Its habitat is dipterocarp, kerangas or lower montane forests up to  altitude.

Uses
The wood is locally used in making domestic items.

References

megacarpa
Trees of Thailand
Trees of Borneo
Trees of Malaya
Plants described in 1914
Flora of the Borneo montane rain forests
Flora of the Borneo lowland rain forests